Treaty of Medina Del Campo can refer to:

Treaty of Medina del Campo (1431), between the Crown of Castile and the Kingdom of Portugal
Treaty of Medina del Campo (1489), between England and the Spain